The Jogeshwari Caves are some of the earliest Hinduism cave temples sculptures located in the Mumbai suburb of Jogeshwari, India. The caves date back to 520 to 550 CE. These caves belongs to the Hindu deity Jogeshwari.  According to historian and scholar Walter Spink, Jogeshwari is the earliest major cave temple in India and (in terms of total length) "the largest".

The caves are located off the Western Express Highway, and are surrounded by encroachments.
The caves are accessed through a long flight of stairs into the main hall of this cavernous space. It has many pillars and a Lingam at the end. Idols of Dattatreya, Hanuman, and Ganesh line the walls. There are also relics of two doormen. The cave also has a murti and footprints of goddess Jogeshwari (Yogeshwari), whom the area is named after. The goddess is considered a Kuladevi by some Marathi people, and also worshipped by some migrant groups from Gujarat.

Gallery

References

External links

Hindu temples in Mumbai
Hindu cave temples in India
Indian rock-cut architecture
Former populated places in India
Caves containing pictograms in India
6th-century establishments in India
Gupta art